Cohasset can refer to:

Places

Cohasset, California
Cohasset, Massachusetts
Cohasset (MBTA station)
Cohasset Rocks, an alternative name for Minots Ledge, a reef off of Cohasset, Massachusetts
Cohasset, Minnesota
Cohasset, Virginia
 Cohasett (Hampton County, South Carolina) - NRHP house in Hampton County
 Lake Cohasset, one of several reservoirs on the eponymous stream of Mill Creek Park in Youngstown, Ohio

Ships
 USS Cohasset, three U.S. Navy ships